Microtis oligantha, commonly known as the small onion orchid is a species of orchid endemic to New Zealand. It has a single thin, hollow, onion-like leaf and up to ten small green flowers. It differs from the other two onion orchids in New Zealand, (M. unifolia and M. parviflora) in being a much smaller plant with a more pointed dorsal sepal.

Description
The lateral sepals are much shorter and narrower than the dorsal sepal and curve downwards. The petals are shorter than the lateral sepals and are mostly enclosed by the dorsal sepal. Flowering occurs from December to March.

Taxonomy and naming
Microtis oligantha was first formally described in 1968 by Lucy Moore from a specimen collected on the edge of Lake Roundabout east of Ashburton and the description was published in the New Zealand Journal of Botany. The specific epithet (oligantha) is derived from the Ancient Greek words oligos meaning "few", "little" or "scanty" and anthos meaning "flower".

Distribution and habitat
The small onion orchid grows in damp grassland and meadows in montane and subalpine parts of both the North, South and Chatham Islands.

Conservation
Microtis eremaea is classified as "not threatened" in New Zealand.

References

External links
 

oligantha
Endemic orchids of New Zealand
Plants described in 1968